Charles Faulkner may refer to: 

 Charles Faulkner (author) (born 1952), American life coach, motivational speaker, trader and writer
 Charles Draper Faulkner (1890–1979), American architect
 Charles J. Faulkner (1806–1884), American politician
 Charles James Faulkner (1847–1929), American politician, son of the above
 Charles Joseph Faulkner (1833–1892), mathematician and fellow of University College, Oxford, and founding partner of Morris, Marshall, Faulker & Co.
 Charlie Faulkner (1941–2023), British rugby union player
 Charles H. Faulkner (1937-2022), American archaeologist and anthropologist
 Charles William Faulkner, printer and publisher of cards and games

See also 
 Charles Faulkner Bryan (1911–1955), American composer, musician, music educator and collector of folk music 
 Charles Falconer, Baron Falconer of Thoroton
 Faulkner (surname)